Waitetuna is a rural community in the Waikato District and Waikato region of New Zealand's North Island. It is located on the valley of the Waitetuna River, upstream from the Raglan Harbour.

History 
Pollen analysis in the sediments of the Waitetuna arm of the harbour shows that the original vegetation of the valley was kahikatea on the flats, and a mixed podocarp-hardwood forest on the slopes, with totara, maire, matai, rimu, rata, beech and tree ferns. Kauri was present, but not abundant.

Waitetuna is part of the rohe of Ngāti Māhanga.

In September 1864, after the invasion of the Waikato, the government bought the  Waipā–Waitetuna block, stretching from the summit of Pirongia to Te Uku Landing, for £1,500. A 2018 Waitangi Tribunal report said, "The Waipa–Waitetuna purchase occurred during a Crown military occupation of land in Waikato (including the area covered by the purchase block) that was carried out with the express purpose of breaking down Māori authority, including customary rights to land. Although the evidence is not sufficient to draw firm conclusions, aspects of the purchase resemble the process of compensation for confiscated land".

Most of the farms were bought from the government in the 1900s and the bush on them was mostly felled, or burnt.

Roads 
Three through roads serve Waitetuna.

The main road, SH23, is served by the Hamilton to Raglan bus. It was formed as a deviation from Old Mountain Rd between 1907 and 1912.

Waitetuna Valley Road runs south to Te Pahu and Te Awamutu. It follows the old Aramiro Track, which was widened to a  track in 1909 and to Fillery Rd about 1990.

Old Mountain Road was originally the main road. It was formed as an extension to the first road, built in 1863 from Raglan via Okete to the Waitetuna River. The county history said, "For a dozen years or more before the county was formed (1875), 10 miles of roughly formed dirt road, wide enough to carry horse-drawn drays, linked Raglan township with the Waitetuna River. From there the packhorse route (originally known as the Tikihouhou Track) made by the Army during the Waikato War, wound a tortuous way across the ranges, but it was too narrow, and too steep in parts, to carry vehicles." It became the through road to Hamilton in 1879.

The main road was metalled between 1914 and 1921 and sealing started in 1937, but wasn't completed until 1961.

Railways 
Waitetuna almost got a railway. In 1923 the Waikato-West Coast railway district was set up under the 1914 Local Railways Act. It got a detailed survey done for a 2 ft 6in gauge railway and had a contractor ready to build a line through the Kaniwhaniwha and Waitetuna valleys, joined by an  tunnel, past Te Uku School and Okete Falls and along the edge of the harbour to Raglan. However, it was opposed by local MP Alexander Young, the proposed local rate was defeated in an election in 1923 and the Board was wound up in 1928.

Demographics 
Waitetuna School is in meshblock 0861000, which had these census returns -

Education

It opened on 3 September 1962.

Until 24 August 1903 Te Uku School was known as Waitetuna. Aramiro School closed in 1964 and its pupils transferred to Waitetuna.

References

Waikato District
Populated places in Waikato